The Terrific Whatzit (real name Merton McSnurtle, also known as McSnurtle the Turtle) is a fictional superhero turtle appearing in American comic books published by DC Comics. DC's first talking animal superhero, the Terrific Whatzit first appeared in Funny Stuff #1 (Summer  1944) and was created by Martin Naydel.

Natasha Lyonne voices the character in the animated film DC League of Super-Pets (2022).

Fictional character biography
McSnurtle is a turtle and shopkeeper who lives in the town of Zooville and is famed for both his honesty and his laziness. He is granted superpowers by two powerful, otherworldly entities (the nice Prince Highness and nasty Prince Lowness) who want to see how a completely honest person would handle being granted superpowers.

When in action as the Terrific Whatzit, McSnurtle removes his shell and dons a costume almost identical to that of the Golden Age Flash save that the lightning bolt emblem is replaced by a "TW" in a yellow circle. The name "Terrific Whatzit" stems from the fact that without his shell, it is hard to tell what kind of animal McSnurtle is.

McSnurtle's last Golden Age appearance as the Terrific Whatzit was in Funny Stuff #17 (January 1947), although he continued to appear from time to time as McSnurtle the shopkeeper in other features. His superheroic identity would not appear again until Captain Carrot and His Amazing Zoo Crew #9 in November 1982, in which he is seen helping the Allies during "the Second Weird War". The series reveals in an earlier story that the Terrific Whatzit is the uncle of Zoo Crew team member Fastback.

Powers and abilities
As the Terrific Whatzit, McSnurtle possessed super-speed powers similar to those of the Golden Age Flash. These powers, while primarily based on superspeed, also include some superstrength (enough to bend a tank's main gun barrel) and the ability to fly. McSnurtle also gains a ghost-like "automatic conscience" who won't relent until he goes into action against the threat of the story.

Other versions
An ordinary turtle wearing the classic Terrific Whatzit costume is seen in DC Super Friends #14 (June 2009), as the adopted pet of the Flash.

A redesigned version of the Terrific Whatzit appeared in the DC Super-Pets children's book Salamander Smackdown, as a superpowered pet of the present day Flash. Unlike the previous versions, this version of the Terrific Whatzit wears a costume similar to the modern Flash's.

In other media
 McSnurtle the Turtle appears in The Flash in two different forms. The first version appears in the episode "Revenge of the Rogues" as the childhood stuffed animal of Iris West. The second appears in the episode "Borrowing Problems from the Future" as a regular turtle that Harrison "HR" Wells gives to Barry Allen as a housewarming gift.
 The Terrific Whatzit appears in the DC Super Hero Girls episode "All Pets Are Off".
 Merton the Turtle / Terrific Whatzit appears in DC League of Super-Pets, voiced by Natasha Lyonne. This version is a non-anthropomorphic female turtle who acquires super-speed after being exposed to orange Kryptonite and goes on to become the Flash's pet and a founding member of the titular League of Super-Pets.

References

External links
 Toonopedia entry on the Terrific Whatzit
 Biographical summaries on the Terrific Whatzit, Fastback and the Crash
 Capstone's DC Super-Pets book Salamander Smackdown

Golden Age superheroes
Comics characters introduced in 1944
DC Comics characters with superhuman strength
Fictional turtles
DC Comics superheroes
DC Comics male superheroes
DC Comics characters who can move at superhuman speeds
Animal superheroes
Fictional anthropomorphic characters
DC Comics animals
Flash (comics) characters
Legion of Super-Pets